Biggers is an Old English surname, and derives from an Old Norse word for a Barley field. Notable people with the surname include:

Cliff Biggers, comic-book writer and journalist
Clyde Biggers, American college football coach
Dan Biggers, American television actor
Earl Derr Biggers (1884–1933), American novelist and playwright
E. J. Biggers (born 1987), American football cornerback
Jeff Biggers (born 1963), American writer and journalist
John T. Biggers (1924–2001), American muralist during the Harlem Renaissance
Sissy Biggers (born 1957), American television personality
Trenesha Biggers (born 1981), American professional wrestler
W. Watts Biggers (1927–2013), American novelist and television writer
William Biggers (18741935), English footballer

Biggers can also refer to:

Biggers, Arkansas, a town in Randolph County, Arkansas
Biggers, Texas, a ghost town in Collin County, Texas